The 1946 Ohio Bobcats football team was an American football team that represented Ohio University in the Mid-America Conference (MAC) during the 1946 college football season. In their 21st and final season under head coach Don Peden, the Bobcats compiled a 6–3 record and were outscored by a total of 206 to 97. In February 1947, head coach Don Peden announced his retirement as the school's football coach, though he continued to serve as the school's athletic director and baseball coach.

Schedule

References

Ohio
Ohio Bobcats football seasons
Ohio Bobcats football